Angela Elizabeth "Angie" Thacker  (born June 27, 1964) is an American long jumper. She was born in St. Louis, Missouri. She competed at the 1984 Summer Olympics in Los Angeles, where she placed fourth in women's long jump.  While competing for the University of Nebraska, she was the 1984 NCAA Indoor Champion in the long jump.

References

1964 births
Living people
American female long jumpers
Athletes (track and field) at the 1984 Summer Olympics
Nebraska Cornhuskers women's track and field athletes
Olympic track and field athletes of the United States
Track and field athletes from St. Louis